The Hunch Backs, or Ngau Ngak Shan, is the twelfth-highest mountain in Hong Kong.

Conservation
The north and north-east slopes of the Hunch Backs and the east slope of Ma On Shan, covering an area of 118 hectares, was designated as a Site of Special Scientific Interest in 1976.

See also
 List of mountains, peaks and hills in Hong Kong
 Ma On Shan (peak)
 Ma On Shan Country Park

References

Further reading
 

Mountains, peaks and hills of Hong Kong
Ma On Shan